The Omega League is a high school athletic conference that is affiliated with the CIF Southern Section. Members are primarily small independent schools in Los Angeles and Ventura counties. The league sponsors eight-man football.

Members
 AGBU Manoukian High School, Pasadena
 Highland Hall Waldorf School, Northridge
 Hillcrest Christian School, Thousand Oaks
 Lighthouse Christian Academy, Santa Monica
 Newbury Park Adventist Academy, Newbury Park
 Ojai Valley School, Ojai
 Pilgrim School, Los Angeles
 San Fernando Valley Academy, Northridge
 Santa Clarita Valley International School, Castaic
 Summit View School, North Hollywood
 Westmark School, Encino

References

CIF Southern Section leagues
Sports in Los Angeles County, California
Sports in Ventura County, California